Jung Jin-Hwa (also Jeong Jin-Hwa, ; born May 25, 1989 in Ulsan) is a modern pentathlete from South Korea. He competed at the 2012 Summer Olympics in London, where he finished eleventh in the men's event, tying for the best result for a South Korean with Kim Mi-Seop at Atlanta in 1996.

Jung also won an individual bronze medal at the 2012 World Modern Pentathlon Championships in Rome, Italy, finishing behind the Russians, world champion Aleksander Lesun and two-time Olympic champion Andrey Moiseev.

At the 2016 Olympics, he finished in 13th place.

References

External links
  (archived page from Pentathlon.org)

1989 births
Living people
South Korean male modern pentathletes
Olympic modern pentathletes of South Korea
Modern pentathletes at the 2012 Summer Olympics
Asian Games medalists in modern pentathlon
Modern pentathletes at the 2014 Asian Games
World Modern Pentathlon Championships medalists
Sportspeople from Ulsan
Medalists at the 2014 Asian Games
Asian Games silver medalists for South Korea
Asian Games bronze medalists for South Korea
Modern pentathletes at the 2016 Summer Olympics
Modern pentathletes at the 2020 Summer Olympics
21st-century South Korean people